Keith F. Hughes (July 27, 1936 – September 21, 2021) was an American politician and lawyer. 

Hughes was born in St. Cloud, Minnesota and graduated the Cathedral High School in St. Cloud. Hughes served in the Reserve Officers' Training Corps while going to college and then served in the Minnesota National Guard. He received his bachelor's degree from College of Saint Benedict and Saint John's University in Collegeville, Minnesota and his law degree from University of Minnesota Law School. He practiced law in St. Cloud and lived with his wife and family in St. Cloud. Hughes served in the Minnesota Senate from 1965 to 1972. Hughes died at the St. Cloud Hospital in St. Cloud, Minnesota.

References

1936 births
2021 deaths
People from St. Cloud, Minnesota
Minnesota National Guard personnel
College of Saint Benedict and Saint John's University alumni
University of Minnesota Law School alumni
Minnesota lawyers
Minnesota state senators